Capitaine, derived from the French for Captain, may also refer to:

 Hogfish (Lachnolaimus maximus), an edible marine fish in the family Labridae, found in the western Atlantic
 Nile perch (Lates niloticus), a freshwater fish in the family Centropomidae, important as food in much of Africa
 USS Capitaine (SS-336), a Balao class submarine of the United States Navy

See also
 Capitaine de vaisseau, a French naval rank